"Bells" is the first episode of the BBC sitcom Blackadder II, the second series of Blackadder, which was set in Elizabethan England from 1558 to 1603. Although "Bells" was the first to be broadcast on BBC1, it was originally destined to be the second episode.

The plot of the episode, of a young woman disguising herself as a man to go into service and falling in love with her employer, is particularly based on a significant plot thread of William Shakespeare's Twelfth Night.

Plot
Kate, an attractive young woman, is attempting to comfort her father upon her mother's death – even though her mother is alive and has run off with Kate's uncle and is living in Droitwich, leaving them destitute. He suggests that Kate become a prostitute to solve their money troubles. Kate refuses indignantly and decides to go to London to seek her fortune, over her father's objections ("Why walk all the way to London when you can make a fortune lying on your back?!").

Lord Blackadder is at home, target practising with his bow and arrow (his servant, Baldrick, is holding the target). Hanger-on Lord Percy enters and announces that he is in love with Jane Harrington. Blackadder remarks casually that he and Baldrick had both slept with her, which throws Percy's aim off and he shoots Baldrick in the groin with an arrow. Kate enters, disguised as a boy, introduces herself as "Bob," and asks to be accepted into Blackadder's service. Blackadder hires her on the spot, firing Baldrick in the process. However, Baldrick is allowed to stay and work for Blackadder, as long as he works a bit harder and lives in the gutter.

Over the next few weeks Lord Blackadder finds himself strangely attracted to his new servant and spends a great deal of time with "Bob". Lord Melchett and the Queen are concerned by this, and even Blackadder himself begins to worry after he nearly kisses "Bob" during a friendly tussle. He seeks advice from a doctor, who prescribes leeches to be dissolved in his mouth, and (on Baldrick's advice) consults the Wise Woman, who gives him three options: 1) kill Bob; 2) commit suicide; or 3) go ahead and sleep with Bob and, to ensure no one ever finds out, kill everyone in the entire world.

With no other options, Blackadder orders Bob out of his service, but the truth is revealed (along with "Bob's" breasts) and after a very brief sexual encounter Blackadder asks Bob/Kate to marry him. She accepts, and the Queen consents, after being reassured that Kate's nose is not prettier than hers. Baldrick is chosen as Kate's bridesmaid, while Edmund's choice for best man is his old school chum, Lord Flashheart, "the best sword, the best shot, the best sailor and the best kisser in the Kingdom".

The wedding service does not go as smoothly as planned. Edmund bribes Kate's father to leave before anyone sees him, and Lord Flashheart has not shown up. With no best man, Blackadder reluctantly asks Percy to fill in. At that moment Flashheart crashes through the roof, throws Percy out, and begins chatting up every woman in the room, including Nursie and Baldrick. He is quite taken with "Bob" and proceeds to steal her from Blackadder. The two of them swap clothes as Kate reveals she now prefers boys' clothing and Flashheart prefers dresses, announce they are running away together, set off a bomb, and disappear. Melchett reminds Edmund that in such circumstances, it is customary for the groom to marry the bridesmaid, a suggestion positively received by Baldrick.

Cast
Rowan Atkinson as Lord Edmund Blackadder
Tim McInnerny as Lord Percy Percy
Tony Robinson as Baldrick
Miranda Richardson as Queen Elizabeth I
Stephen Fry as Lord Melchett
Patsy Byrne as Nursie
Gabrielle Glaister as Kate/Bob
Rik Mayall as Lord Flashheart
John Grillo as Dr. Leech
Edward Jewesbury as Kate's Father
Sadie Shimmin as The Young Crone
Barbara Miller as The Wise Woman

Production

Writing
The episode marks the first appearance of the Bob/Kate and Flashheart archetypes that appear again in Blackadder Goes Forth. Rik Mayall, who played Lord Flashheart, allegedly designed the character's costume himself. John Lloyd has said that Mayall virtually rewrote his part to feature "loads of jokes", which annoyed the writers, Curtis and Elton. The studio recording took place on Thursday 13 June 1985.

Locations
This was the only episode of the series to feature location filming, at Wilton House near Salisbury in Wiltshire.

Music
The music performed as Blackadder courts "Bob" is Vaughan Williams' "Fantasia on Greensleeves".

In other media

Audio
In 1993, in conjunction with Comic Relief, this episode was given away free on cassette tape with boxes of PG Tips tea.

Sequels

Upstart Crow
Bob also appears in Ben Elton's 2016 sitcom, Upstart Crow.  Gabrielle Glaister reprises the role, and once again plays a woman pretending to be a man, this time in order to be a judge in the episode "The Quality of Mercy". Using the full name "Robert Roberts", it's not been confirmed whether this is the same Bob from Blackadder II.

References

External links

 
  (Archived episode guide)
 

Blackadder episodes
1986 British television episodes
Television shows written by Ben Elton
Cross-dressing in television
Cultural depictions of Elizabeth I
Television shows written by Richard Curtis